Cheng Shu (born 11 July 1987) is a Chinese badminton doubles player.

Achievements

BWF World Championships 
Women's doubles

Asian Championships 
Women's doubles

East Asian Games 
Women's doubles

Asian Junior Championships 
Girls' doubles

BWF Superseries 
The BWF Superseries, launched on 14 December 2006 and implemented in 2007, was a series of elite badminton tournaments, sanctioned by the Badminton World Federation (BWF). BWF Superseries had two levels: Superseries and Superseries Premier. A season of Superseries features twelve tournaments around the world, introduced in 2007, with successful players invited to the BWF Superseries Finals held at the year's end.

Women's doubles

  BWF Superseries Finals tournament
  BWF Superseries Premier tournament
  BWF Superseries tournament

BWF Grand Prix 
The BWF Grand Prix has two levels: Grand Prix and Grand Prix Gold. It is a series of badminton tournaments, sanctioned by Badminton World Federation (BWF) since 2007.

Women's doubles

  BWF Grand Prix Gold tournament
  BWF Grand Prix tournament

BWF International Challenge/Series 
Women's doubles

  BWF International Challenge tournament
  BWF International Series tournament

References

External links 
 

1987 births
Living people
Sportspeople from Nantong
Badminton players from Jiangsu
Chinese female badminton players
Badminton players at the 2010 Asian Games
Asian Games gold medalists for China
Asian Games medalists in badminton
Medalists at the 2010 Asian Games
World No. 1 badminton players
21st-century Chinese women